Plebejus is a genus of butterflies in the family Lycaenidae. 
Its species are found in the Palearctic and Nearctic realms.

Taxonomy
As a result of studies of molecular phylogenetics, numerous species that were included in Plebejus by some authors at the beginning of the 21st century have now been moved to separate genera again. These species may be found  in Afarsia, Alpherakya, Agriades, Aricia, Eumedonia, Icaricia, Kretania, Maurus, Pamiria, Patricius, Plebejidea, Plebulina, and Rueckbeilia.

Species
Species include:

The ardis species-group:
 Plebejus eversmanni (Lang, 1884) Kopet-Dagh, Ghissar, Darvaz, Pamirs-Alai, Tian-Shan, Afghanistan, Uzbekistan 
 Plebejus baroghila (Tytler, 1926) Himalayas
 Plebejus firuskuhi (Forster, 1940) Afghanistan
 Plebejus kwaja (Evans, 1932) Baluchistan

The argus species-group:
 Plebejus aegidion (Gerhard, 1851) Central Asia
 Plebejus argus (Linnaeus, 1758) – silver-studded blue

The idas species-group (a.k.a. subgenus Lycaeides):
 Plebejus agnata (Rühl, 1895)
 Plebejus argyrognomon (Bergsträsser, [1779]) – Reverdin's blue
 Plebejus pseudaegon (Butler, [1882]) Ussuri, North China, North Korea, Japan
 Plebejus sinica (Forster, 1936) Sichuan
 Plebejus maracandica (Erschoff, 1874) Russia, Transbaikalia, Yakutia, Magadan. Mongolia, Kamchatka
 Plebejus caspica (Forster, 1936) South Urals
 Plebejus lepidus Zhdanko, 2000 Kazakhstan
 Plebejus uiguricus Zhdanko, 2000 ltai, Saur, Tarbagatai Mts., Dzhungarsky Alatau
 Plebejus mongolicus Rühl, [1893] Transbaikalia, Amur, Mongolia
 Plebejus baldur (Hemming, 1934) Kurdistan, Levant
 Plebejus bellieri (Oberthür, 1910) Corsica
 Plebejus argiva (Staudinger, 1886) Kazakhstan, Alai
 Plebejus christophi (Staudinger, 1874) – small jewel blue
 Plebejus anikini Yakovlev, 2012 Mongolia
 Plebejus germani Yakovlev, 2012 Mongolia
 Plebejus roxane (Grum-Grshimailo, 1887) Tajikistan, Afghanistan
 Plebejus idas (Linnaeus, 1761) – Idas blue or northern blue
 Plebejus ganssuensis (Grum-Grshimailo, 1891) Kuku-Noor, China
 Plebejus nushibi Zhdanko, 2000 Kazakhstan
 Plebejus calliopis (Boisduval, 1832) Alps, boreal Europe and Transcaucasia to Russian Far East and Kamchatka
 Plebejus anna (Edwards, 1861) – Anna's blue
 Plebejus melissa (Edwards, 1873) – Melissa blue or orange-bordered blue
 Plebejus fridayi (Chermock, 1945) Oregon
 Plebejus nevadensis (Oberthür, 1910) Iberia
 Plebejus tomyris (Grum-Grshimailo, 1890) Amur
 Plebejus samudra (Moore, [1875]) Northwest India, Hindu Kush
 Plebejus rogneda (Grum-Grshimailo, 1890) Kashgar, Darvaz, Pamirs, Transalai
 Plebejus subsolanus (Eversmann, 1851) Transbaikalia, Amur, Ussuri, Mongolia, Korea, Japan.
 Plebejus iburiensis (Butler, [1882]) Japan
 Plebejus cleobis (Bremer, 1861) Siberia, Altai, Transbaikalia, Russian Far East, Amur, Ussuri, Japan

Ungrouped:
 Plebejus sharga Churkin, 2004 Mongolia
 Plebejus shuroabadica (Shchetkin, 1963) Tajikistan
 Plebejus dzhizaki Zhdanko, 2000 Uzbekistan
 Plebejus bergi Kusnezov, 1908 Kazakhstan
 Plebejus noah (Herz, 1900) Turan
 Plebejus qinghaiensis (Murayama, 1992)
 Plebejus hishikawai (Yoshino, 2003) Tibet
 Plebejus callaghani Carbonell & Naderi, 2007 Iran
 Plebejus choltagi (Zhdanko & Churkin, 2001)
 Plebejus fyodor Hsu, Bálint & Johnson, 2000
 Plebejus maidantagi Zhdanko & Churkin, 2001
 Plebejus tillo Zhdanko & Churkin, 2001
 Plebejus churkini Zhdanko, 2001 Tian-Shan
 Plebejus exterius Zhdanko, 2001 Tian-Shan
 Plebejus zhdankoi Churkin, 2002 Tian-Shan
 Plebejus mellarius Churkin & Zhdanko, 2008 Kyrgyzstan
 Plebejus arpa (Churkin & Pletnev, 2012) Kyrgyzstan
 Plebejus aleremiticus (Churkin & Pletnev, 2012) Tadjikistan

References

 
Lycaenidae genera
Taxa named by Jan Krzysztof Kluk